Fail Blog (stylized as FAIL Blog) is a comedic blog website created in January 2008.

FAIL Blog features disastrous mishaps and general stupidity in photos and video which have captions such as "fail", "epic fail", "X Fail", or "X; You're doin' it wrong" (X being the activity at which the subject has failed). There are also multiple sites under the FAIL Blog brand, including Failbook (which features FAILs on Facebook), Ugliest Tattoos, and There, I Fixed It. The website has also triggered a meme that contains bad grammar (usually posted in the comments of Failblog videos), "Did he died".

History
In January 2008, FAIL Blog was launched. The site grew steadily in popularity; in May 2008, FAIL Blog was sold to Pet Holdings Inc. (now Cheezburger Inc.), becoming part of the Cheezburger Network. Ben Huh notes that FAIL Blog "really started to take off when the financial industry decided to — ahem — fail." As an example, at a United States Senate hearing in September 2008, a demonstrator held up a sign reading "FAIL" behind Henry Paulson, the former Treasury secretary, and Ben Bernanke, chairman of the Federal Reserve. By January 2010, FAIL Blog was receiving 1.1 million unique visitors per month.

Reception and influence
FAIL Blog won two Webby Awards in 2009, for People's Voice in Humor and Weird. The site has been profiled in multiple publications: The Times named FAIL blog their #3 comedy website, the Los Angeles Times called FAIL Blog, a "fan favorite," Time magazine noted that FAIL Blog has "helped popularize fail as both a noun and an exclamation, not to mention an easier-to-spell synonym for schadenfreude", and The New York Times called it a "runaway hit." The site is also commonly referenced in popular culture; The Huffington Post called Netflix a "walking failblog" in reference to their July 2011 pricing change and The Atlantic called a Chris Coghlan baseball blunder "a debacle worthy of FAIL Blog."

In July 2009, FAIL Blog posted a screenshot of the Guinness record webpage for "Most Individuals Killed in a Terrorist Attack" which was accompanied with a "Break this record" link. Guinness threatened legal action, and the story was picked up by TechCrunch and CNET.

See also
 Failbook
 I Can Has Cheezburger?
 List of Internet phenomena

References

External links
 

American comedy websites
Internet humor
Internet memes
Photoblogs
Internet properties established in 2008
Comedy-related YouTube channels
YouTube channels launched in 2008
English-language YouTube channels